The Rouse Company, founded by Hunter Moss and James W. Rouse in 1939, was a publicly held shopping mall and community developer from 1956 until 2004, when General Growth Properties (GGP) purchased the company.

Beginnings - Moss-Rouse Company

The Moss-Rouse Company was founded as a FHA mortgage company with a loan from Hunter Moss's sister. Rouse leveraged his knowledge as loan guarantee specialist at the Federal Housing Administration to establish a Baltimore-based mortgage company specializing in FHA backed loans. Moss-Rouse hired a World War Two Navy friend, Churchill G. Carey from Connecticut General, who in turn provided capital for future projects. Carey would hold positions ranging from president to CEO of the mortgage company subsidiary. In 1952-1953 the company built one of the first modern architecture office buildings on Saratoga Street in Baltimore, while also dropping its commercial lending business line. Jim Rouse hired his brother, Willard Rouse II, in 1952, and partner, Hunter Moss, phased out of operations, selling his shares of the company, while remaining temporarily on the board of directors. The firm was renamed the James W. Rouse & Company, Inc., with Rouse owning 50% equity, his brother, Willard, 10%, and 40%, to company officers.

The James W. Rouse Company
The James W. Rouse Company built some of the first enclosed shopping malls, and it pioneered the development of festival marketplaces, such as Jacksonville Landing in Jacksonville, Faneuil Hall in Boston, South Street Seaport in New York City, Harborplace in Baltimore, and Bayside Marketplace in Miami. They also developed The Shops at National Place in downtown Washington, D.C. that opened in 1984–85.

On 20 June 1966, The James W. Rouse Company was renamed The Rouse Company. The company has been credited as the pioneer of the first successful food court in an enclosed shopping mall, when the food court at the Sherway Mall in Toronto opened in 1971. It followed an unsuccessful attempt at the Plymouth Meeting Mall in 1968, which reportedly failed because it was "deemed too small and insufficiently varied."

The company moved its headquarters to the Cross Keys development, then to the project at Columbia, Maryland in December 1969.

Its community projects include the Village of Cross Keys in Baltimore and the planned cities of Columbia, Maryland (where it was headquartered), Bridgeland Community, Texas, and Summerlin, Nevada. To develop these projects, in 1962 Rouse brought on Bill Finley, who built a planned "company town", Ravenswood, West Virginia, was a former planner with the National Capital Planning Commission proposing planned cities, and was a proponent of public-private partnerships.

Columbia Research and Development was founded as a public company and Howard Research and Development was formed as a Rouse subsidiary in 1956 to raise capital for four mall projects and later to facilitate the Columbia Project with Connecticut General and Chase Manhattan as stakeholder with interest deferred loans. In 1966 The James W Rouse Company was restructured as the Rouse Company, adding Howard Research and Development (HRD) as a separate entity shielded Rouse Corporation from debt liability of the Columbia development. HRD lost money, with new rules affecting the parent company as well. In 1974, HRD was refinanced. Columbia Development Corporation was formed a subsidiary of HRD using subcontracted Rouse Company employees. In 1985 CIGNA (Connecticut General) divested its interest in HRD and the project back to Rouse for $120 million at a net loss.

Rouse created the subsidiary company The American City Corporation to take advantage of the National Urban Policy and New Community Development Act of 1970, A HUD program which granted developers incentives and loans to build Title VII "New Towns" with mandatory percentages of low income housing projects. Rouse's former ACTION member, Leo Molinaro was selected to run the subdivision. The symposiums held by the company gathered together investors like George Mitchell, who would go on to develop Woodlands, Texas using the Columbia model.  The subsidiary was based at "Two Wincopin" in the second office building in built in Columbia in 1968. It was renamed the American City Building, using the subsidiary to lease the empty space and develop the system of Public-Private partnerships that Rouse would use worldwide to minimize risk in developments using public debt. The business was given its own postal office, the American Cities Station in 1977.

The Columbia development was marketed as a progressive community for all races. In 1971, the company responded to pressure from the NAACP that the company was absent of African Americans at all management levels and its businesses in Columbia were predominantly white owned. The company responded with an affirmative action program in November 1971.

In 1973, the former assistant attorney general of Maryland, Mathias J. DeVito, left the Rouse-owned legal firm of DLA Piper to replace James W. Rouse as President of the Rouse Company, and Rouse became Chairman. DeVito cut staff from 1,700 to 500 to keep the company afloat in 1975. In 1974, the Columbia development got a political boost as the population of Columbia supported a slate of at-large council candidates with Columbia interests, including Ruth U. Keeton, Lloyd Knowles, and Columbia's city manager, Richard L. Anderson.

In 1979, Simon H. Schuer acquired a 7.5% interest in the Rouse Company. He was the creator of "The Shrink", a method where an investor buys an interest in a company, then orders stock buy-backs to make the interest more valuable. Schuer died the day after the purchase, and Trizec Properties then acquired the shares and bought a 25% stake. In 1986, the company attempted to purchase a majority share.

In 1985, The Rouse Company absorbed all of Connecticut General's interests in the Howard Research and Development subsidiary. In 1986, former general manager of Columbia and executive vice president of development Micheal Spear became president as a successor to Rouse. In 1990, Spear died in a crash with his wife and one daughter in his Piper PA-31T Cheyenne attempting a single engine missed approach near Logan International Airport.

In 1997, Anthony Deering took over as CEO of the company.

In 1996, Howard Hughes Corporation, which had extensive property and other business interests, became a subsidiary.

On November 12, 2004, the Rouse Company was sold to General Growth Properties.

In 2012, General Growth Properties spun off 30 malls into a new real estate investment trust, Rouse Properties.

Investments
 Freedom shopping center (1953) - A 308 unit combination apartment complex and shopping center funded by Moss-Rouse.
Mondawmin Mall (October 1956) - Baltimore, Maryland with partner Harry Bart.
Talbottown (1957) - A Easton shopping center adjacent to the Spring Hill Cemetery where citizens rejected early Alexander Smith Cochran modernist architecture.
Harundale Mall (1958) - Glen Burnie, MD. Financed by Connecticut General. First enclosed mall east of the Mississippi River. Closed in 1997, now Harundale Plaza, an outdoor shopping center.  
Cherry Hill Mall (1961) - Delaware Township, now Cherry Hill, New Jersey.
Pocantico Hills (1962) - A cancelled "Village" concept for John D. Rockefeller's grandchildren. David Rockefeller would later finance $10 Million of the Columbia Project.
Village of Cross Keys (1963) - First "planned community" conversion of a golf course to high-rise residential and commercial.
 Planned community (1966) - Howard Research and Development formed to build planned community of Columbia Maryland.
Salem Mall (1966) - Trotwood, Ohio. Closed in 2005, demolished shortly thereafter.
Eastfield Mall (1967) - Springfield, Massachusetts
 Echelon Mall (1969) - Voorhees, New Jersey. Groundbreaking began to build the Echelon Mall (Now the Voorhees Town Center). The mall was opened in 1970.
 Planned community (1969) - Greater Hartford Corporation formed to redevelop Hartford, Connecticut suburbs with Connecticut General funding.
 Planned community (1970) - Failed project to develop 10,600 acres of Staten Island as "New Richmond".
 The Mall in Columbia (1971) - Columbia, Maryland
 Perimeter Mall (1971) - Atlanta, Georgia
 Highland Mall (1971) - Austin, Texas. Closed on April 30, 2015.
 Woodbridge Center (1971) - Woodbridge Township, New Jersey
 Planned community (1972) - Failed project to develop Wye Island with 706 homes.
 Planned community (1973) - Failed project to develop 5,000 acres in Memphis, Tennessee as Shelby Farms with First Horizon National Corporation.
 Exton Square (1973) - Square shaped enclosed mall in Exton, Pennsylvania
 Tampa Bay Center (1976) - Two level enclosed mall in Tampa, Florida. Closed in 2002, demolished in 2005.
 Hulen Mall (1977) - Two level enclosed mall in Fort Worth, Texas
 The Gallery at Market East (1977) - Philadelphia, Pennsylvania. Reconstructed from 2016-2019 with the new name Fashion District Philadelphia
 Harborplace (1980) - A downtown marketplace built on the Baltimore Steam Packet Company docks. Indoor mall closed December 31, 2021.
 White Marsh Mall - first part of the White Marsh Town Center project. Opened in 1981.
Burlington Center (1981) - Burlington Township, New Jersey. Opened August, 1982. Closed in 2018, demolished in 2021.
South Street Seaport (1983) - Festival Marketplace in Lower Manhattan, New York.
The Waterside (June 1983) - Festival Marketplace in Norfolk, Virginia.
Jacksonville Landing (June 1985) - Festival Marketplace in Jacksonville, Florida.
Sixth Street Marketplace (September 1985 - 2003) - Festival Marketplace in Richmond, Virginia.
New Orleans Riverwalk (1986) Festival Marketplace
Owings Mills Mall (July 1986) - Owings Mills, Maryland. Closed in 2015, demolished in 2016. Now Mill Station, a lifestyle center.
Westlake Center (1988) - Seattle, Washington.
Underground Atlanta (1989) - Renovation 
The Centre at Salisbury (1989) - Salisbury, Maryland.
Oviedo Mall (1997) - Oviedo, Florida. The last mall built by Rouse.

References

Real estate companies established in 1939
Defunct real estate companies of the United States
Columbia, Maryland
Defunct companies based in Maryland
Shopping center management firms
Companies disestablished in 2004
1939 establishments in the United States
Rouse family